Idol Ko si Kap is a Philippine television situational comedy series broadcast by GMA Network. Starring Bong Revilla, it premiered on September 17, 2000 on the network's KiliTV line up. The series concluded on September 3, 2005 with a total of 505 episodes. It was replaced by Hokus Pokus in its timeslot.

Cast

Lead cast
Bong Revilla

Supporting cast
Jolo Revilla
Rufa Mae Quinto
Leo Martinez
Jimmy Santos
German Moreno
Anne Curtis
Luz Valdez
Antonio Aquitania
K Brosas

References

External links
 

2000 Philippine television series debuts
2005 Philippine television series endings
Filipino-language television shows
GMA Network original programming
Philippine comedy television series